Doorin Road railway station served Doorin Point in County Donegal, Ireland.

The station opened on 18 August 1893 on the Donegal Railway Company line from Donegal to Killybegs, and it closed on 1 January 1960.

Routes

References

Disused railway stations in County Donegal
Railway stations opened in 1893
Railway stations closed in 1960